Atractoceros is a genus of moths in the family Brachodidae.

Species
Atractoceros albiciliata (Walsingham, 1891)
Atractoceros xanthoprocta (Meyrick, 1914)

References

Brachodidae